Richard Ramos is a French restaurant critic and politician of the Democratic Movement (MoDem) who has been serving as a member of the National Assembly since 18 June 2017, representing the department of Loiret.

Early career
Before entering politics full-time, Ramos worked as restaurant critic for France 3.

Political career
Ramos has been a member of MoDem since 2008.

In parliament, Ramos serves as a member of the Committee on Economic Affairs. In addition to his committee assignments, he is part of the French-Algerian Parliamentary Friendship Group and the French-Moroccan Parliamentary Friendship Group.

Political positions
In July 2019, Ramos voted against the French ratification of the European Union’s Comprehensive Economic and Trade Agreement (CETA) with Canada.

References

1968 births
Living people
Deputies of the 15th National Assembly of the French Fifth Republic
Democratic Movement (France) politicians
People from Blois
Politicians from Centre-Val de Loire
French people of Spanish descent
Deputies of the 16th National Assembly of the French Fifth Republic
Members of Parliament for Loiret